The Numismatic Museum of Aruba is a former numismatic museum in the city of Oranjestad in Aruba. It was founded by J. Mario Odor and was opened on 13 November 1981. The collections included coins, paper money, and stamps of Aruba and other countries. The museum is now closed.

See also 
 List of museums in Aruba

References 

1981 establishments in Aruba
Defunct museums in Aruba
Museums established in 1981
Numismatic museums in the Americas
Buildings and structures in Oranjestad, Aruba
20th-century architecture in the Netherlands